The 2006 Grand Prix of Portland was the fifth round of the 2006 Bridgestone Presents the Champ Car World Series Powered by Ford season, held on June 18, 2006 at the Portland International Raceway in Portland, Oregon.  Bruno Junqueira won the pole. Junqueira's Pole Position was ninth and final of his career. A. J. Allmendinger won the race, his first Champ Car victory, in his first race since leaving RuSPORT, the team which brought him to Champ Car, for Forsythe Championship Racing.

Qualifying results

Race

Caution flags

Notes

 New Race Lap Record Will Power 59.259
 New Race Record A. J. Allmendinger 1:48:32.853
 Average Speed 113.989 mph

Championship standings after the race

Drivers' Championship standings

 Note: Only the top five positions are included.

References

External links
 Allmendinger Shifts to Forsythe 
 Friday Qualifying Results 
 Saturday Qualifying Results 
 Race Results

Port
Portland Grand Prix
Grand Prix of Portland
2006 in Portland, Oregon